Francesco Morosini was an ironclad battleship  built in the 1880s and 1890s for the Italian Regia Marina (Royal  Navy).

The ship's construction period was very lengthy, beginning in August 1881 and completing in February 1888. She was quickly rendered obsolescent by the new pre-dreadnought battleships being laid down, and as a result, her career was limited. She spent her career alternating between the Active and Reserve Squadrons, where she took part in training exercises each year with the rest of the fleet. The ship was stricken from the naval register in August 1909; the following month, she was expended as a target ship for experiments with torpedoes.

Design

The ship had a short forecastle, connected by a hurricane deck to a raised sterncastle. Her superstructure included a small conning tower with a bridge on the forecastle. The ship was fitted with a single, heavy military mast placed amidships. She had a crew of 507–509 officers and men.

Her propulsion system consisted of a pair of compound marine steam engines each driving a single screw propeller. Steam was supplied by eight coal-fired, cylindrical fire-tube boilers that were vented through a pair of widely spaced funnels at the ends of the hurricane deck.

Francesco Morosini was armed with a main battery of four  27-caliber guns, mounted in two pairs en echelon in a central barbette. She carried a secondary battery of two  32-cal. guns, one at the bow and the other at the stern, and four  32-cal. guns; two of these were placed side by side behind the bow 152 mm gun, and the other two were mounted side by side on the aft superstructure. As was customary for capital ships of the period, she carried five  torpedo tubes submerged in the hull.

The deck sloped downward at the sides to provide additional protection against incoming fire. The barbette had  of steel armor.

Service history

Construction – 1895

Francesco Morosini was under construction for nearly eight years. She was laid down at the Venetian Arsenal on 4 December 1881 and launched on 30 July 1885. She was not completed for another four years, her construction finally being finished on 21 August 1889. Because of the rapid pace of naval technological development in the late 19th century, her lengthy construction period meant that she was an obsolete design by the time she entered service. In addition, technological progress, particularly in armor production techniques—first Harvey armor and then Krupp armor—rapidly rendered older vessels like Francesco Morosini obsolete.

Francesco Morosini took part in the annual fleet maneuvers of 1894 in 2nd Division of the Active Squadron, along with the protected cruiser , the torpedo cruiser , and four torpedo boats. The squadron was based at La Spezia at the time. In 1896, she cruised off Crete as the flagship of the 2nd Division, under Rear Admiral E. Gaulterio. During that year's summer maneuvers, held in July 1896, Francesco Morosini continued as Gaulterio's flagship; the 2nd Division also included her sister  and the protected cruiser . The 1st and 2nd Divisions of the Active Squadron were tasked with defending against a hostile fleet, simulated by older ships in reserve.

1897–1909

Francesco Morosini deployed to Crete to serve in the International Squadron, a multinational force made up of ships of the Austro-Hungarian Navy, French Navy, Imperial German Navy, Regia Marina, Imperial Russian Navy, and Royal Navy that intervened in the 1897–1898 Greek uprising on Crete against rule by the Ottoman Empire. She took part in the squadron's final operations when, as flagship the Italian division of the International Squadron, she departed Crete along with the British battleship  (flagship of the commander of British forces in the squadron, Rear-Admiral Gerard Noel) and the Russian armored cruiser Gerzog Edinburgski (flagship of the commander of the squadron's Russian forces, Rear Admiral Nikolai Skrydlov) in steaming to Milos with the French protected cruiser Bugeaud, flagship of the International Squadron's overall commander, Rear Admiral Édouard Pottier. At Milos, they rendezvoused with Prince George of Greece and Denmark aboard his yacht. After Prince George boarded Bugeaud on 20 December, Francesco Morosini, Revenge, and Gerzog Edinburgski escorted Bugeaud to Crete, where Prince George disembarked on 21 December 1898 to take office as the High Commissioner of an autonomous Cretan State under the suzerainty of the Ottoman Empire, bringing the Cretan uprising to an end.

In 1898, Francesco Morosini was transferred to the Reserve Squadron, along with Ruggiero di Lauria and the ironclad  and five cruisers. The In 1899, Francesco Morosini and her two sisters returned to the Active Squadron, which was kept in service for eight months of the year, with the remainder spent with reduced crews. In 1900, Francesco Morosini and her sisters were significantly modified and received a large number of small guns for defense against torpedo boats. These included a pair of  guns, ten  40-caliber guns, twelve  guns, five 37 mm revolver cannon, and two machine guns.

This squadron only entered active service for two months of the year for training maneuvers, and the rest of the year was spent with reduced crews. In 1908, the Italian Navy decided to discard Francesco Morosini and her sister Ruggiero di Lauria. She was formally stricken from the naval register in August 1909, and was thereafter used as a target ship for a torpedo experiment. On 15 September, she was sunk at La Spezia; the experiment was conducted to test the effect of a torpedo hit in order to develop more a more effective hull design. The explosion tore a  hole in the hull, causing her to list severely and sink on her side. Her wreck was later scrapped.

Notes

References
 Brassey, Thomas A., ed. (1899). The Naval Annual (Portsmouth: J. Griffin & Co.).
 
 Brassey, Thomas A., ed. (1907). The Naval Annual (Portsmouth: J. Griffin & Co.).
 Clowes, Sir William Laird. The Royal Navy: A History From the Earliest Times to the Death of Queen Victoria, Volume Seven. London: Chatham Publishing, 1997. .  
 
 
 
 
 
 Robinson, Charles N., ed. (1897). The Navy and Army Illustrated (London: Hudson & Kearns) III (32).

External links
 Fancesco Morosini (1885) Marina Militare website

Ruggiero di Lauria-class battleships
1885 ships
Ships built in Venice
Maritime incidents in 1909
Ships sunk as targets
Ships built by Venetian Arsenal